Amir Rashad, (born April 21, 1980) better known by his stage name Kafani, is an American rapper from the Funktown section of San Antonio, Oakland, California. He graduated from Oakland High School in 1998 where he played varsity baseball for the Wildcats. He is one half of the Oakland-based rap group Babyface Assassins. He is also signed to Thizz Nation, a subdivision of the late Mac Dre's label Thizz Entertainment.

Legal issues & Controversies
In February 2008, he was arrested on weapons and drug charges following a high speed car chase.

On August 26, 2011, rumors were that Kafani started a feud with Lil B when he told the rapper in a YouTube video "When I come off house arrest I'm gonna embarrass your bitch ass." However Kafani denied this and police investigators never found evidence of foul play by either party.

In November 2011, the son of Kafani's cousin, a one-year-old boy named Hiram Lawrence, was fatally shot, the victim of a random shooting in West Oakland. Initial reports indicated a crowd was present at the filming of a music video for the Oakland-based rapper. Kafani said the crowd had gathered outside the liquor store to film a music video, but that he was not involved, nor present, during the filming.

On September 28, 2013, Kafani was shot several times in East Oakland after shooting a music video. He was permanently paralyzed from the waist down. On October 18, 2013, he spoke for the first time since the shooting, in which he said "Took 5 shots they say I might not walk again but I'm on God's team so I know I'm going to win.". Kafani has launched a crowdfunding campaign with a concert on Sept 12, 2014 to acquire an assistive robotic device to walk again  

On September 13,2022, Kafani was sentenced to 7 years (87 months) in elaborate fraud involving mortgages and gold bars.

Discography

Studio albums
 Money's My Motivation (2007) - #6 Top Heatseekers Pacific
 Movin' Mean (2009)
 Maserati Music (2010)
 Still Fast (2012)

EPs
 Cutie Pie, Pt. 2 - EP (2008)
 Need Ya Body - EP (2009)
 She Ready Now - EP (2011)
 Bay Area Boss - EP (2011)

Mixtapes
 Mr. Cranberry (2010)
 Lifestyles of the Rich & Famous (2011)
 De$tined to Rule (2013)

with Rayven Justice
 Both Side of the Tracks (2012)

Singles
 "Fast (Like a NASCAR)" (featuring Keak da Sneak) #24 Bubbling Under R&B/Hip-Hop Songs
 "She Ready Now" #22 Bubbling Under R&B/Hip-Hop Songs

Guest appearances

References

External links
Official Kafani Twitter
Official Kafani Facebook
Official Kafani MySpace

Living people
Rappers from Oakland, California
Rappers from the San Francisco Bay Area
1981 births
21st-century American rappers
21st-century American male musicians
American shooting survivors
People with paraplegia
Wheelchair users